AdJ (Aprendiendo de Jesús) is a distribution of OpenBSD for Spanish speakers. 
The source code is available in GitHub.

To learn how to install there is a challenge on P2PU.

Release history 

Each version is based on the corresponding version of the sources of OpenBSD.

This distribution has been cited by a number of independent authors.

References

OpenBSD
Spanish language